is a railway station in the city of Yonezawa, Yamagata Prefecture, Japan, operated by East Japan Railway Company (JR East).

Lines
Ōsawa Station is served by the Ōu Main Line, and is located 28.8 rail kilometers from the terminus of the line at Fukushima Station.

Station layout
The station has two opposed unnumbered side platforms connected via a level crossing.  The station is located within a snow shelter, due to the very heavy snowfall in the region in winter. The station is unattended.

Platforms

History
Ōsawa Station began as a signal stop on 15 May 1899 and was elevated to a full passenger station on 25 December 1906. The station was absorbed into the JR East network upon the privatization of JNR on 1 April 1987.

Future plans 
The station will be bypassed by all trains between 10 January 2023 and 26 March 2023 owing to extremely low ridership. By 2005, daily ridership had fallen to an average of two users per day.

Surrounding area

See also
List of Railway Stations in Japan

References

External links

 JR East station information 

Stations of East Japan Railway Company
Railway stations in Yamagata Prefecture
Ōu Main Line
Railway stations in Japan opened in 1906
Yonezawa, Yamagata